Blake Oshiro (born January 16, 1970) is an American politician and lawyer. From 2011 to 2014, he served as deputy chief of staff to the Governor of Hawaii Neil Abercrombie. Oshiro previously served as Majority Leader of the Hawaii House of Representatives, where he represented District 33, comprising the Honolulu neighborhoods of Aiea and Halawa. He spent ten years in the legislature. In 2011, Oshiro completed Harvard University's John F. Kennedy School of Government program for Senior Executives in State and Local Government as a David Bohnett Foundation LGBTQ Victory Institute Leadership Fellow.

Oshiro was first elected to the House in 2000 and took office the following January. He subsequently won re-election at two-year intervals. Oshiro came out as gay in 2010 during the debate over Hawaii House Bill 444, which granted civil union rights to same-sex couples in Hawaii. He subsequently faced a socially conservative primary challenger in his 2010 race for reelection, Honolulu City Councilman Gary Okino. Oshiro defeated Okino by 56 percent to 44%. In the general election held on November 2, 2010, Oshiro was reelected over Republican opponent Sam Kong by a margin of 54.5% to 45.5%.

In November 2011, Oshiro announced that he would resign from the legislature in order to become Neil Abercrombie's deputy chief of staff. His resignation became effective December 7, 2011. Per Hawaii law, Governor Abercrombie had to select Oshiro's successor as state representative from the 33rd district. He chose former state representative and majority leader Tom Okamura, who Oshiro had succeeded in January 2001. Due to poor health, Okamura had to resign just weeks after accepting the appointment. Abercrombie appointed Heather Giugni, a Native Hawaiian filmmaker, to the seat in February 2012.

After Abercrombie left office at the end of 2014, Oshiro returned to the private sector as a lawyer with Honolulu law firm Alston Hunt Floyd.

References 

1970 births
Democratic Party members of the Hawaii House of Representatives
LGBT state legislators in Hawaii
Living people
Gay politicians
Hawaii politicians of Japanese descent
Hawaii people of Okinawan descent
American LGBT people of Asian descent
American politicians of Ryukyuan descent
21st-century LGBT people